Alma Lesch (March 12, 1917 – May 15, 1999) was an American fiber artist known for her fiber portraits.  She was "the undisputed grande dame of Kentucky textile arts." A historic marker notes her achievements in Shepherdsville, Kentucky where Lesch lived and had her studio.  Lesch's quilt, Bathshebas Bedspread, was included in the Objects: USA exhibit in 1969, which was organized by S.C. Johnson and Son.

Early life
Lesch began her first quilt at the age of five, completing it seven years later. She graduated from Murray State University in 1941 and earned a master's degree in education from the University of Louisville in 1962.

Career
Lesch taught at the Louisville School of Art and the University of Louisville.  She also taught at the Haystack Mountain School of Crafts and Arrowmont School of Crafts.

Her style frequently used found objects, quilting of personal garments, and embroidery in her works.  Her fiber portraits are fabric collages made from antique clothing, however they intentionally exclude the subject's face and limbs, allowing the viewer to imagine the subject.  She pioneered this style of portrait in the 1960s, in which she arranged "clothing stitched on to a quilt as though they were positioned for a portrait." Although her contemporary, Marilyn Pappas, used a similar technique, Lesch's portraits are unique in that they touch on the themes of her life lived in Kentucky, including farming, social manners, and folk art.

Lesch influenced other artists such as Jane Burch Cochran. She was named a Master Craftsman by the World Craft Council in 1974 and a Fellow of the Kentucky Guild of Artists and Craftsmen in 1986. She won the Kentucky Governor's Award for Lifetime Contribution to Visual Arts in 1987.

Solo exhibitions

 1963: The Signature Shop, Atlanta, GA, USA
 1964: The Arts Club, Louisville, KY, USA
 1964: Oakland City College, Oakland City, IN, USA
 1965: Jewish Community Center, Louisville, KY, USA
 1967: Austin Peay State College, Clarksville, TN, USA
 1968: University of Kentucky, Lexington, KY, USA
 1969: The cloth: Textiles on Biblical themes, Speed Art Museum, Louisville, KY, USA
 1972: Craft Alliance Gallery, St. Louis, MO, USA
 1976: Society of Arts and Crafts, Boston, MA, USA
 1981: Alma Lesch: Fabric collage portraits and other works, Danville, KY, USA
 1989: Alma Lesch, ArtsSpace, Louisville, KY, USA
 1997: Alma Lesch: A retrospective, Liberty Gallery, Louisville, KY, USA
 1997: Alma Wallace Lesch: Master maker, Kentucky Museum of Art and Craft
 2006: Alma Lesch: A life in fabric, Louisville, KY, USA

Collections
 Speed Art Museum, Louisville, Kentucky, USA
 American Craft Museum, New York, NY, USA
 Flint Institute of Art, Flint, MI, USA
 Johnson Collection of Contemporary Crafts
 Evansville Museum of Art, Evansville, IN, USA
 Bridwell Art Library, University of Louisville, Louisville, KY, USA
 Citizen's Bank, Glasgow, KY, USA

Works and publications

References

Further reading
 
 Johns, M. (2011). "Tenacious Threads: Crazy Quilts as an Expressive Medium for Making Art." Thesis, Georgia State University.
 Meloy, M. M. (1985). A Web of Kentucky thread. Fiberarts, vol. 12, p. 72.
 Ogden, A. B. (1997). Alma Wallace Lesch. American Craft, vol. 57, p. 82.
 Ramsey, B. (1993). Art and quilts: 1950-1970. Uncoverings, vol. 14, p. 9-40.
 Walcott, E Austen. "Alma Lesch Retrospective." Surface Design Journal. Vol. 22, (Fall 97).

External links
Bullitt Memories: Alma Wallace Lesch, A Remarkable Artist
 Profile at the Kentucky Museum of Art and Craft
 Finding aid for Alma Lesch's papers at the University of Louisville's Margaret M. Bridwell Art Library

University of Louisville alumni
University of Louisville faculty
20th-century American artists
Artists from Kentucky
1917 births
1999 deaths
Murray State University alumni
People from Ballard County, Kentucky
20th-century American women artists
American women academics
Quilters
American embroiderers